Lejławki may refer to the following places in Poland: 

Lejławki Małe 
Lejławki Wielkie